Twin Peaks is an 8,878-foot-elevation (2,706 meter) double summit mountain in Placer County, California, United States.

Description
Twin Peaks is located four miles west of Tahoe Pines and Lake Tahoe, along the boundary that Lake Tahoe Basin Management Unit shares with Granite Chief Wilderness. It is situated on the crest of the Sierra Nevada mountain range, with precipitation runoff from the peak draining east to Lake Tahoe, and west to the Rubicon River via Bear Pen Creek. Blackwood and Ward valleys, which each head near Twin Peaks and terminate at Lake Tahoe, were formed by glaciers. The Alpine Meadows ski area is three miles north of Twin Peaks. The Tahoe Rim Trail traverses the south slope of the peak and the Pacific Crest Trail traverses the west slope, which provide approach options. This landform's descriptive toponym has been officially adopted by the U.S. Board on Geographic Names. It was originally named "Twin Peak" by the Wheeler Survey in the 1870s and it has appeared in publications since at least 1891.

Climate
According to the Köppen climate classification system, Twin Peaks is located in an alpine climate zone. Most weather fronts originate in the Pacific Ocean and travel east toward the Sierra Nevada mountains. As fronts approach, they are forced upward by the peaks (orographic lift), causing them to drop their moisture in the form of rain or snowfall onto the range.

See also
 
 List of Lake Tahoe peaks

Gallery

References

External links
 Weather forecast: Twin Peaks
 Twin Peaks: Tahoeogul.org

North American 2000 m summits
Mountains of Northern California
Tahoe National Forest
Mountains of the Sierra Nevada (United States)
Mountains of Placer County, California